Elizabeth Hartley Winthrop is an American writer.

She was born in New York City in 1979. She attended Harvard University and graduated Phi Beta Kappa and summa cum laude in 2001, with a B.A. in English and American Literature and Language. She earned an M.F.A. degree in fiction from the University of California, Irvine in 2004, where she was the recipient of the Schaeffer Writing Fellowship.

In addition to her novels, she has written short fiction for Wind, The Evansville Review, The Missouri Review, The Red Rock Review, and Indiana Review. She lives in Gloucester, Massachusetts with her husband and daughter, and she is Associate Professor of English/Creative Writing at Endicott College.

Works 
 Fireworks (2006)
 December (2008)
 The Why of Things (2013)
 The Mercy Seat (2018)

References

External links 
 Official website
 Review of December in The Chicago Sun-Times
 Review of Fireworks in The New York Times

1979 births
Living people
21st-century American novelists
Harvard College alumni
University of California, Irvine alumni
21st-century American women writers
21st-century American short story writers
Endicott College faculty